Amerika Square (Plateia Amerikis) is a 2016 Greek drama film directed by Yannis Sakaridis. It was selected as the Greek entry for the Best Foreign Language Film at the 90th Academy Awards, but it was not nominated.

Plot
Nakos, a racist Greek nationalist, is unemployed and still lives with his parents at age 38. He tracks the increasing number of immigrants in his apartment building with disgust. His friend Billy, a tattoo artist, falls in love with African singer Tereza, but she wants to leave Greece. Tarek, a Syrian doctor, is also looking to flee the country with his daughter. Their stories merge when Tereza and Tarek's plans to escape are inadvertently thwarted by Nakos.

Cast
 Vassilis Koukalani as Tarek
 Yannis Stankoglou as Billy
 Makis Papadimitriou as Nakos
 Alexandros Logothetis as Manolis
 Rea Pediaditaki as Nandia
 Themis Bazaka as Georgia
 Errikos Litsis as Stavros

See also
 List of submissions to the 90th Academy Awards for Best Foreign Language Film
 List of Greek submissions for the Academy Award for Best Foreign Language Film

References

External links
 

2016 films
2016 drama films
Films about immigration
Films about racism
Greek drama films
2010s Greek-language films